The Toronto Nationals are a pair of defunct Tier II Junior "A" & Junior "B" ice hockey teams from Vaughan, Ontario, Canada.  They were a part of the Ontario Provincial Junior A Hockey League and the Metro Junior B Hockey League.

Jr. A Nationals
In 1975, the Nationals won their one and only Junior "A" league title.  They went on to the Ontario Hockey Association Championship and met the Southern Ontario Junior A Hockey League Champion Guelph CMC's.  Guelph came out on top 4-games-to-2.  The Nationals folded in 1977.

Season-by-season results

Playoffs
1973 Lost Final
Toronto Nationals defeated Aurora Tigers 4-games-to-none
Toronto Nationals defeated Richmond Hill Rams 4-games-to-2
Wexford Raiders defeated Toronto Nationals 4-games-to-1
1974 Lost Quarter-final
North Bay Trappers defeated Toronto Nationals 4-games-to-3
1975 Won League, Lost OHA Buckland Cup
Toronto Nationals defeated Richmond Hill Rams 4-games-to-2
Toronto Nationals defeated Seneca Flyers 4-games-to-none
Toronto Nationals defeated Wexford Raiders 4-games-to-1 OPJHL CHAMPIONS
Guelph CMC's (SOJHL) defeated Toronto Nationals 4-games-to-2
1976 Lost Semi-final
Toronto Nationals defeated Royal York Royals 3-games-to-2
Toronto Nationals defeated Weston Dodgers 2-games-to-none
North York Rangers defeated Toronto Nationals 4-games-to-1
1977 Lost Quarter-final
Markham Waxers defeated Toronto Nationals 4-games-to-none

Jr. B Nationals
In the early 1970s, the Toronto Nationals also had an entry in the Metro Junior B Hockey League who were 1973 Metro Champions and runners up for the Sutherland Cup All-Ontario title.  The 1975-76 season saw a 14-year-old Wayne Gretzky challenge the wishes of the Canadian Amateur Hockey Association and sign with the Toronto Nationals.  Barely 16 years old, Gretzky had played two seasons with the Nationals and scored 63 goals for 132 points in just 60 games.  The Nationals won the 1977 Metro championship, led by the young Gretzky with 75 points in just 23 playoff games.  The next season, he signed with the Sault Ste. Marie Greyhounds, a quick stop before going professional and starting what is considered by many hockey enthusiasts as the greatest career in hockey history.

Season-by-season results

Sutherland Cup appearances
1973: Sarnia Bees defeated Toronto Nationals 4-games-to-2

Notable Jr. B alumni
Bill Gardner
Wayne Gretzky
Basil McRae
Rick Middleton
Dave Shand
Daryl Evans
Dwight Foster
Rob Palmer
Warren Holmes

External links
OHA Website

Defunct ice hockey teams in Canada
Ice hockey teams in Ontario
Sport in Vaughan